William Albert Shockley Jr. (March 13, 1937 – December 7, 1992) was an American football kicker and halfback who played for four seasons for four different teams, the New York Titans, Buffalo Bills, and the Pittsburgh Steelers.  He played college football at West Chester University.

References

1937 births
1992 deaths
American football halfbacks
American Football League players
American football placekickers
Buffalo Bills players
New York Titans (AFL) players
People from West Chester, Pennsylvania
Pittsburgh Steelers players
Players of American football from Pennsylvania
Sportspeople from Chester County, Pennsylvania
West Chester Golden Rams football players